Sanguisorbic acid is a constituent of some ellagitannins. It is constituted by a hexahydroxydiphenic acid unit linked by an O-C bond to a gallic acid. The differences with its isomers, valoneic acid and nonahydroxytriphenic acid, are that the hydroxyl that links the hexahydroxydiphenoyl (HHDP) group to the galloyl group belongs to the galloyl group in valoneic acid, while in nonahydroxytriphenic acid, the hexahydroxydiphenic acid unit is linked by a C-C bond to gallic acid.

It is found in 2,3-O-hexahydroxydiphenoyl-4,6-O-sanguisorboyl-(α/β)-glucose, an ellagitannin found in Rubus sanctus. It is also found in lambertianin A, B, C and D, all ellagitannins found in Rubus lambertianus.

See also 
 Valoneic acid

References

External links 
 Plant polyphenols: vegetable tannins revisited by Edwin Haslam, page 136

Ellagitannins
Biphenyls
Dihydroxybenzoic acids
Trihydroxybenzoic acids
Catechols
Pyrogallols
Diphenyl ethers